Radman is a small village in Al Haymah Ad Dakhiliyah District of Sanaa Governorate, Yemen. It is located on the mountain of the same name, near Jabal an-Nabi Shu'ayb.

History 
The earliest known mention of Radman in historical sources is in 1275 (674 AH). Historical sources mentioning it include the Ghayat al-amani of Yahya ibn al-Husayn and the Kitab al-Simt of Muhammad ibn Hatim al-Yami al-Hamdani. It had a fort.

References 

Villages in Sanaa Governorate